David John Morgan (born September 1942) is a British engineer who claims to have invented the plastic traffic cone in 1960. His company produced most of the world's traffic cones. He has the world record for the largest collection of traffic cones, which numbers over 500.

Early life
He attended Sherrardswood School.

Career
He set up his company Oxford Plastic Systems in Oxfordshire.

Personal life
He lives in Fulbrook, Oxfordshire.

References

1942 births
British inventors
Imperial Chemical Industries people
People from West Oxfordshire District
Plastics industry
Living people